San Juan Mixtepec may refer to:

Languages
San Juan Mixtepec Mixtec
San Juan Mixtepec Zapotec

Places
San Juan Mixtepec, Miahuatlán, Oaxaca
San Juan Mixtepec, Mixteca, Oaxaca